Edward Denis Joseph Breslin (10 March 1882 – 26 August 1914) was a member of the Queensland Legislative Assembly.

Biography
Breslin was born in Brisbane, Queensland, the son of Cornelius Connell Breslin and his wife Ellen (née Gallagher). He was educated at Nudgee College in Brisbane before attending St John's College, Sydney.

Breslin died at Gladstone in August 1914.

Public life
Breslin, representing Labour, won the seat of Port Curtis in the Queensland Legislative Assembly at the 1909 state election. He held the seat in 1912 state election by two votes but the election of Breslin was later declared null and void by Justice Charles Chubb, the elections judge of the Queensland Supreme Court and he lost the resulting by-election in October 1912.

References

Members of the Queensland Legislative Assembly
1882 births
1914 deaths
Australian Labor Party members of the Parliament of Queensland
20th-century Australian politicians